Fareham red brick is a famous red-tinged clay brick, from Fareham, Hampshire. Notable buildings constructed of these distinctive bricks include London's Royal Albert Hall and Knowle Hospital (previously known as Hampshire County Lunatic Asylum).

References

Bricks
Fareham